RJTV 31 (DXRJ-TV) is a UHF, free to air television channel in the Philippines, owned and operated by Rajah Broadcasting Network, Inc. owned by Ramon "RJ" Jacinto. The station's studios and transmitters are located at Cagayan de Oro.

RJTV Programs

Note: Two shows from RJTV continues airing (Thank God It's RJ Live! and RJ Sunday Jam) at 23:00 and 09:00 PHT respectively.

RJTV stations nationwide

See also
 Rajah Broadcasting Network

References

External links
 Official Site

Television stations in Cagayan de Oro
2nd Avenue (TV channel) stations
Television channels and stations established in 1995